Joslyn Yvonne Hoyte-Smith  (born 16 December 1954 in Barbados) is a British former 400 metres athlete. Joslyn grew up in Leeds and attended Matthew Murray High School between 1966 and 1973.

Athletics career
Hoyte-Smith competed in the 1980 Summer Olympics in Moscow, where, as part of the women's 4×400 metres relay team, she won a bronze medal. She also ran in the 4 × 400 m relay team at the 1984 Summer Olympics in Los Angeles. She was the winner of the 400m at the UK Championships in 1979, 1981 and 1983. She also won the 400m title at the AAA Championships in 1981. She represented England and won a gold medal in the 4 x 400 metres relay event, at the 1978 Commonwealth Games in Edmonton, Alberta, Canada. Four years later she represented England and won a bronze medal in the 400 metres event, at the 1982 Commonwealth Games in Brisbane, Queensland, Australia.

She now lives in Kent, England and is currently Athlete Support Manager for Yorkshire. Hoyte-Smith is chair of the GB Olympians, the national association for Olympic athletes.

References

External links 
 
 
 

1954 births
Living people
English female sprinters
Olympic athletes of Great Britain
Olympic bronze medallists for Great Britain
Commonwealth Games bronze medallists for England
Athletes (track and field) at the 1980 Summer Olympics
Athletes (track and field) at the 1984 Summer Olympics
Athletes (track and field) at the 1978 Commonwealth Games
Athletes (track and field) at the 1982 Commonwealth Games
Barbadian emigrants to England
British female sprinters
English Olympic medallists
Commonwealth Games medallists in athletics
Medalists at the 1980 Summer Olympics
Olympic bronze medalists in athletics (track and field)
Olympic female sprinters
Medallists at the 1982 Commonwealth Games